Russians in Taiwan form a small community. As of August 2021, statistics of Taiwan's National Immigration Agency (NIA) showed 593 Russians holding valid Alien Resident Certificates. Informal estimates claim that their population may be as large as one thousand people.

History
Some Russians from Shanghai and Xinjiang fled the establishment of the People's Republic of China and resettled in Taiwan in 1949. One cultural institution among the Russian community in Taiwan that survives from those days is the Astoria Confectionery and Cafe near Taipei Railway Station, the first Russian-style eatery on the whole island. Founded in 1949 by five Russian émigrés from Shanghai, it continues operating today with an early local business partner as the sole owner.

In recent years, the Representative Office for the Moscow-Taipei Coordination Commission on Economic and Cultural Cooperation has been active in promoting academic and professional exchanges between the two countries. According to NIA statistics, 174 Russian students studied at institutions in Taiwan, and 20 were employed as instructors; 21 were housewives, 28 were children under 15 years of age, and the remaining 120 engaged in other types of work. Unlike in other European communities, men are relatively scarce, with a sex ratio of 1.36 women for every man.

See also
 Republic of China–Russia relations

References

Russian
Russian diaspora in China
Taiwan